Daniël Sarel 'Darius' Botha  (26 June 1955 – 12 February 2018) was a South African rugby union player.

Playing career

Botha played for the Northern Transvaal under–20 side in 1974 to 1975 and made his debut for the Northern Transvaal senior side in 1976. He and his younger brother Naas, played for Northern Transvaal in five Currie Cup finals from 1977 to 1981. In four of those five years, 1977, 1978, 1980 and 1981 Northern Transvaal won the Currie Cup and in 1979 they shared it with Western Province.

Botha played in only one test match for the Springboks, being the first test on the 1981 tour to New Zealand at Lancaster Park, Christchurch. He also played in seven tour matches for the Springboks, scoring three tries.

Test history

Death
Botha was first diagnosed with stomach cancer in 2014. After an operation the cancer went into remission, but unfortunately in November 2017, the cancer returned and Botha died on 12 February 2018.

See also
List of South Africa national rugby union players – Springbok no. 522

References

1955 births
2018 deaths
South African rugby union players
South Africa international rugby union players
Blue Bulls players
People from Msukaligwa Local Municipality
Rugby union players from Mpumalanga
Rugby union wings